Johann Neumann may refer to:

 Johann Neumann (footballer)
 Johann Balthasar Neumann (1687–1753), German architect
 Johann Philipp Neumann (1774–1849), wrote the text for Schubert's Deutsche Messe.
 Johann Georg Neumann (1661–1709), German Lutheran theologian and church historian